The James Hamilton House is a historic home located in Bowie, Prince George's County, Maryland, United States. The home was built in the mid-1870s, and is a -story gable-roofed frame Late Victorian house with Italianate detail.  Outbuildings include a board-and-batten meat house contemporary with the house, a garage constructed in the 1950s, and a large concrete block dairy barn to the east of the house, constructed in the 1960s.

The James Hamilton House was listed on the National Register of Historic Places in 1988.

References

External links
, including photo in 1984, at Maryland Historical Trust website

Houses completed in 1875
Victorian architecture in Maryland
Houses in Prince George's County, Maryland
Buildings and structures in Bowie, Maryland
Houses on the National Register of Historic Places in Maryland
National Register of Historic Places in Prince George's County, Maryland